The Holsten Family Farmstead is located in Columbus, Wisconsin.

Description
The farm includes an 1889 cream-brick Italianate farmhouse with Gothic details, an earlier Greek Revival home which has been converted to a granary, a barn with part built pre-1876, a corn crib, chicken coops, other sheds, orchard and gardens. The Holstens helped organize the Springbrook creamery and ice house in 1885, the Columbus Poultry Assoc. in the 1920s, and other community efforts. It was added to the State Register of Historic Places in 1991 and to the National Register of Historic Places the following year.

References

Farms on the National Register of Historic Places in Wisconsin
National Register of Historic Places in Columbia County, Wisconsin
Italianate architecture in Wisconsin
Industrial buildings completed in 1889
Houses completed in 1889